Ray Drinkwater (18 May 1931 – 24 March 2008) was an English footballer, who played in the Football League for Portsmouth and Queens Park Rangers.

Drinkwater was born in Jarrow, County Durham and began his career with Guildford City in 1951. He signed for QPR in 1957 from Portsmouth and made his debut in a 1–1 draw with Coventry City in March 1958. He played 199 league games for QPR.

Ray left QPR in 1963, moving to non-league Bath City.

He died on 24 March 2008, aged 76.

External links
 
 Obituary: Surrey Advertiser

Queens Park Rangers F.C. players
Portsmouth F.C. players
Sportspeople from Jarrow
Footballers from Tyne and Wear
1931 births
2008 deaths
English footballers
Association football goalkeepers
Guildford City F.C. players
Bath City F.C. players
English Football League players